Italika is a motorcycle brand and manufacturer in Mexico, with 400,000 motorcycles sold in 2014. In 2010, Italika made up 55% of the Mexican motorcycle market; in 2011 it reached a 63% market share, largely owing to low initial cost. Italika sold their one-millionth motorcycle on March 23, 2011, and their two-millionth motorcycle on September 5, 2014. Early Italika motorcycles were designed jointly with Hyosung of South Korea and assembled using parts shipped from South Korea and China. Current models, however, are of Mexican design and origin. Italika maintains a motorcycle factory and parts warehouse in Toluca, Mexico, near Mexico City.

The Italika motorcycles are produced mainly for the Mexican market and exported to Guatemala, Honduras, Panama, Peru, Brazil and Costa Rica.

Italika motorcycles come in red, yellow, orange, black, and silver-grey color schemes, while scooters and ATVs are available in several other colors.

Models

Italika makes models of street legal motorcycles

   Underbone moped, or step-through motorcycle
  Standard Vespa-style scooter
  Motorcycle
  Standard Motorcycle and a scooter
  Standard Vespa-style scooter
  Motorcycle
  Motorcycle
  Standard and Sportbikes, and ATV's

Italika also makes a variety of offroad ATVs

References

External links
 Italika's company site
 Italika Largest Motorcycle Brand in Mexico Italika 
 Italika Sells One Millionth Motorcycle

Vehicle manufacturing companies established in 2005
Motorcycle manufacturers of Mexico
Manufacturing companies of Mexico
Mexican brands